Eigil Helland-Hansen (5 November 1910 – 26 April 1997) was a Norwegian travel agent.

He was born in Årstad, Bergen to oceanographer Bjørn Helland-Hansen and Anna Marie Krag, and was the father of ceramist Grete Nash. Helland-Hansen was assigned with the organization Norway Travel Association from 1934, and from 1940 he was responsible for the periodical Rutebok for Norge, which he edited for about forty years. He edited the magazine Reiseliv i Norge from 1946 to 1959.

References

1910 births
1997 deaths
Businesspeople from Bergen
20th-century Norwegian businesspeople
Norwegian magazine editors